Below are the squads for the Football at the 1951 Mediterranean Games, hosted by Egypt, and took place between 14 and 18 October 1951.

Coach:

Coach: Giannis Helmis

Coach:

References 

1951
Sports at the 1951 Mediterranean Games